The 1991–92 Honduran Liga Nacional season was the 26th edition of the Honduran Liga Nacional.  The format of the tournament remained the same as the previous season. C.D. Motagua won the title after defeating Real C.D. España in the finals.  Both teams qualified to the 1992 CONCACAF Champions' Cup.

1991–92 teams

 Atlético Indio (Tegucigalpa, promoted)
 C.D. Marathón (San Pedro Sula)
 C.D. Motagua (Tegucigalpa)
 C.D. Olimpia (Tegucigalpa)
 C.D. Petrotela (Tela)
 C.D. Platense (Puerto Cortés)
 Real C.D. España (San Pedro Sula)
 Sula (La Lima)
 C.D. Victoria (La Ceiba)
 C.D.S. Vida (La Ceiba)

 Platense played their home games at Estadio Francisco Morazán due to renovations at Estadio Excélsior.

Regular season

Standings

Final round

Pentagonal standings

Final

 Motagua won 1–0 on aggregate score.

Top scorer
  Eduardo Bennett (Olimpia) with 12 goals

Squads

Known results

Week 1

Week 3

Week 10

Pentagonal

Unknown rounds

Controversies
On 14 April 1991, C.D. Victoria lost at home to C.D. Olimpia on week 1 with a 3–5 score.  The game was later protested by Victoria due to the inclusion of Antonio Hernández in the Olimpia's lineup.  Hernández, who had been sent off in the last game of the previous season, was inactive for one game.  After two months of uncertainty, the Discipline Board decided to ignore Victoria's claim after they received a notification from Olimpia stating that Hernández complied with the suspension in an off-season friendly.

References

Liga Nacional de Fútbol Profesional de Honduras seasons
1991–92 in Honduran football
Honduras